This is a list of films produced in Sweden and in the Swedish language in the 1990s. For an A-Z see :Category:Swedish films.

1990s

External links
 Swedish film at the Internet Movie Database

1990s
Films
Swedish

nl:Lijst van Zweedse films
zh:瑞典電影列表